In differential geometry, the Lie–Palais theorem states that an action of a finite-dimensional Lie algebra on a smooth compact manifold can be lifted to an action of a finite-dimensional Lie group. For manifolds with boundary the action must preserve the boundary, in other words the vector fields on the boundary must be tangent to the boundary.   proved it as a global form of an earlier local theorem due to Sophus Lie.

The example of the vector field d/dx on the open unit interval shows that the result is false for non-compact manifolds.

Without the assumption that the Lie algebra is finite dimensional the result can be false.  gives the following example due to Omori: the Lie algebra is all vector fields f(x,y)∂/∂x + g(x,y)∂/∂y acting on the torus R2/Z2 such that g(x, y) = 0 for 0 ≤ x ≤ 1/2. This Lie algebra is not the Lie algebra of any group.  gives an infinite dimensional generalization of the Lie–Palais theorem for Banach–Lie algebras with finite-dimensional center.

References
 Reprinted in collected works volume 5. 

Lie algebras
Theorems in differential geometry